Granger is a city in Dallas and Polk counties in the U.S. state of Iowa. The population was 1,654 at the time of the 2020 census, up 184% from 583 in 2000. It is part of the Des Moines–West Des Moines Metropolitan Statistical Area.

Geography
Granger is located at  (41.761672, -93.823921).

Beaver Creek flows near the town site.

Demographics

2010 census
As of the census of 2010, there were 1,244 people, 461 households, and 330 families living in the city. The racial makeup of the city was 98.5% White, 0.3% African American, 0.4% Asian, 0.2% from other races, and 0.6% from two or more races. Hispanic or Latino of any race were 1.5% of the population.

There were 461 households, of which 44.3% had children under the age of 18 living with them, 55.7% were married couples living together, 11.5% had a female householder with no husband present, 4.3% had a male householder with no wife present, and 28.4% were non-families. 22.1% of all households were made up of individuals, and 6.3% had someone living alone who was 65 years of age or older. The average household size was 2.59 and the average family size was 3.06.

The median age in the city was 32 years. 30.2% of residents were under the age of 18; 5.7% were between the ages of 18 and 24; 34.7% were from 25 to 44; 17.7% were from 45 to 64, and 11.5% were 65 years of age or older. The gender makeup of the city was 50.1% male and 49.9% female.

2000 census
As of the census of 2000, there were 583 people, 245 households, and 150 families living in the city. The racial makeup of the city was 98.63% White, 0.17% African American, 0.86% Asian, 0.34% from other races. Hispanic or Latino of any race were 0.51% of the population.

There were 245 households, out of which 26.5% had children under the age of 18 living with them, 48.2% were married couples living together, 8.2% had a female householder with no husband present, and 38.4% were non-families. 35.9% of all households were made up of individuals, and 10.2% had someone living alone who was 65 years of age or older. The average household size was 2.18 and the average family size was 2.85.

21.4% are under the age of 18, 8.7% from 18 to 24, 26.9% from 25 to 44, 21.8% from 45 to 64, and 21.1% who were 65 years of age or older. The median age was 40 years. For every 100 females, there were 99.0 males. For every 100 females age 18 and over, there were 92.4 males.

The median income for a household in the city was $31,442, and the median income for a family was $47,750. Males had a median income of $34,125 versus $23,750 for females. The per capita income for the city was $19,110. About 2.8% of families and 5.2% of the population were below the poverty line, including 2.7% of those under age 18 and 8.0% of those age 65 or over.

Water towers
Granger is well known for having two water towers, with one labeled HOT and the other labeled COLD (both jokingly).

Education
The Woodward-Granger Community School District serves most of the children in Granger, but the Johnston Community School District also serves a section of Granger.

The nearest Catholic school of the Roman Catholic Diocese of Des Moines is St. Pius X School in Urbandale. The diocese formerly operated Assumption Catholic School in Granger. Circa 2013 it had about 82-92 students. In 2016 that was down to 62. In addition to the enrollment drop, the school's expenses grew. The school closed in 2016. The area Catholic high school is Dowling Catholic High School in West Des Moines.

References

Cities in Iowa
Cities in Dallas County, Iowa
Cities in Polk County, Iowa
Des Moines metropolitan area